is a former Japanese football player and manager.

Playing career
Morishita was born in Hamamatsu on December 9, 1967. After dropping out of Kokushikan University, he joined Tosu Futures which started in 1987. In 1996, he retired.

Coaching career
Morishita worked with youth formations of Consadole Sapporo and Júbilo Iwata before entering in the staff of Avispa Fukuoka. He coaches Zweigen Kanazawa since 2012 and he won the first edition of J3 League in 2014, conquering the promotion to J2 League. In 2018, he signed with J3 League club Giravanz Kitakyushu. However he was sacked for poor results in June 2018 when the club was at the bottom place of 22 clubs.

Managerial statistics

References

External links

1967 births
Living people
Kokushikan University alumni
Association football people from Shizuoka Prefecture
Japanese footballers
Japan Football League (1992–1998) players
Sagan Tosu players
Japanese football managers
J2 League managers
J3 League managers
Zweigen Kanazawa managers
Giravanz Kitakyushu managers
Association football midfielders